Gladstone Nature Park is a park in Gladstone, Oregon, United States.

References

External links

 Gladstone Nature Park at the City of Gladstone, Oregon
 Friends of Gladstone Nature Park
 Gladstone Nature Park Site Plan, City of Gladstone, Oregon (2020)

Gladstone, Oregon
Parks in Clackamas County, Oregon